Sadako DX is a 2022 Japanese supernatural slasher comedy film directed by Hisashi Kimura. It is an installment in the Ring franchise, and stars Fuka Koshiba as a quick-witted high school student who has to unravel the cursed videotape after finding out her sister has seen it, discovering that the curse now claims the victim's life only twenty four hours after viewing it. Sadako DX also stars Kazuma Kawamura and Mario Kuroba.

Sadako DX premiered at the 2022 Fantasia International Film Festival. It was released in Japan on 28 October the same year.

Synopsis
Sadako DX follows Ayaka Ichijo (Fuka Koshiba), a graduate high school student who is skeptical about the video tape and the legend surrounding it, which have become a viral sensation. She soon learns that her sister Futaba (Yuki Yagi) has viewed a copy of the tape, and discovers that Futaba's death is set to occur not in seven days, but 24 hours, leading her to unravel the curse of Sadako to save her sister with the help from her boyfriend Oji Maeda (Kazuma Kawamura), as well as a talented psychic and fortune teller Master Kenshin (Hiroyuki Ikeuchi).

Cast
 Fuka Koshiba as Ayaka Ichijo
 Kazuma Kawamura as Oji Maeda
 Mario Kuroba
 Hiroyuki Ikeuchi as Master Kenshin
 Yuki Yagi as Futaba, Ayaka's sister

Music
The film's theme song, "REPLAY", is performed by Sandaime J Soul Brothers.

Release
Sadako DX had its world premiere at the 2022 Fantasia International Film Festival on 30 July, followed by its release in Japan on 28 October.

References

External links
 

The Ring (franchise)
2020s Japanese films
2022 horror films
2022 films
2010s Japanese-language films
2010s ghost films
Japanese ghost films
Japanese supernatural horror films
Films about curses
Films about death
Films about the Internet
Films about social media
2010s Japanese films